Karin Kiwus (born 9 November 1942) is a German poet from Berlin. After studying journalism, German studies and politology she worked as an editor as well as a university teacher in Austin, Texas. She was the domestic partner of the German film director Frank Beyer until his death in 2006. She has been active in the field of collaborative poetry, writing renshi under the guidance of Makoto Ooka.

Works

"Von beiden Seiten der Gegenwart". Poems. 1976.
"Vom Essen und Trinken". 1978.
"Angenommen später". Poems. 1979.

References

1942 births
Living people
German poets
Writers from Berlin
German political scientists
German women poets
Members of the Academy of Arts, Berlin
German-language poets
Women political scientists